Sergio Mendes is an album by Brazilian keyboardist Sérgio Mendes, released in 1983 on A&M Records. It was his first top 40 album in nearly a decade and a half, his second self-titled album, and was accompanied by his biggest chart single ever, "Never Gonna Let You Go", a song written by Barry Mann and Cynthia Weil and with a lead vocal performed by Joe Pizzulo and Leeza Miller that reached No. 4 on the Billboard Hot 100.  The album was released with Spanish-language versions of the songs as Picardía.

Track listing
"VooDoo" (Douglas Brayfield, Ronaldo Monteiro De Souza, Ivan Lins, Vítor Martins) - 3:55 
"Never Gonna Let You Go" (Barry Mann, Cynthia Weil) - 4:15 
"My Summer Love" (Adrienne Anderson, Serge Gainsbourg, Alain Chamfort) - 4:00 
"Carnaval Festa Do Interior" (Mary Ekler, Moraes Moreira, Abel Silva) - 3:50 
"Rainbow's End" (Don Freeman, David Batteau) - 4:03 
"Love Is Waiting" (David & Jenny Batteau, Don Freeman) - 3:47 
"Dream Hunter" (Danny Sembello, Michael Sembello) - 3:02 
"Life in the Movies" (Michael Sembello, Dennis Matkosky) - 3:52 
"Si Senor" (Juan Carlos Calderón) - 3:46

Personnel 
 Sérgio Mendes – keyboards (1, 4-6, 8), percussion (2-4, 6, 7, 9), acoustic piano (3, 7, 9), Fender Rhodes (3, 7, 9), synthesizers (3, 7, 9), arrangements (3, 7, 8), rhythm arrangements (4, 5, 6)
 Michael Boddicker – synthesizers (1, 8)
 Robbie Buchanan – acoustic piano (2, 5, 6), Fender Rhodes (2, 5, 6), synthesizers (2, 5, 6), arrangements (2), synthesizer horns and string arrangements (5, 6)
 Don Freeman – vocals (4), acoustic piano (5, 6), clavinet (5, 6), rhythm arrangements (5, 6)
 Ben Bridges – guitars (1, 4), rhythm arrangements (1)
 Michael Sembello – guitars (1, 4, 5-8), vocals (3), arrangements (3, 7, 8), rhythm arrangements (5, 6)
 Paul Jackson Jr. – guitars (2, 9)
 Michael Landau – guitar solo (2)
 John Pisano – guitars (9)
 Nathan Watts – bass (1, 3, 4, 9), rhythm arrangements (1)
 Nathan East – bass (2, 5, 6, 9) 
 Louis Johnson – bass (7)
 Teo Lima – drums (1, 4, 7), percussion (7)
 John Robinson – drums (2, 3)
 Raymond Pounds – drums (5)
 Vinnie Colaiuta – drums (6)
 Carlos Vega – drums (8)
 Ed Greene – drums (9)
 Steve Forman – percussion (1, 2, 4, 6, 7, 9)
 Sebastiao Neto – percussion (1, 3, 4, 6, 7), "voo doo" man (1)
 Ron Powell – percussion (3)
 Edson Aparecido da Silva (AKA Cafe) – percussion (4)
 Ernie Watts – horns (1, 4), saxophone solo (1)
 Bill Reichenbach Jr. – horns (1, 4), tuba solo (4)
 Gary Grant – horns (1, 4)
 Jerry Hey – horns (1, 4), horn arrangements (1, 4)
 Juan Carlos Calderón – string arrangements (9)
 Leza Miller – vocal solo (1), vocals (1, 2, 4, 6, 8), backing vocals (5, 8)
 Carol Rogers – vocal solo (1), vocals (1, 4), backing vocals (5, 8)
 Gracinha Leporace – vocals (1, 3), backing vocals (5, 8)
 Geoff Lieb – vocals (1, 4)
 Bill Martin – vocals (1, 4)
 Robert Martin – vocals (1, 4)
 Suzanne Wallach – vocals (1, 4), backing vocals (5)
 Joe Pizzulo – vocals (2)
 Danny Sembello – vocals (5)
 Cruz Baca – backing vocals (8)

Production
 Sérgio Mendes – producer 
 José Quintana – producer (9)
 Geoff Gillette – recording (1, 2, 4, 5, 6, 7, 9)
 Larry Hinds – recording (3, 8)
 Tim Dennen – assistant engineer 
 Benny Faccone – assistant engineer 
 Bob Winard – assistant engineer 
 Bruce Sweedin – mixing 
 Bernie Grundman – mastering at A&M Studios (Hollywood, California)
 Chuck Beeson – art direction 
 Melanie Nissen – design 
 Otto Stupakoff – photography

Reception

In his retrospective review of the album, AllMusic’s Richard S. Ginell gave it two stars (of a possible five). He took aim at the hit "Never Gonna Let You Go", calling it "a saccharine ballad, where Joe Pizzulo and Leza Miller sing their banalities while Sergio strums and comps on synthesizers". He was critical of the album as a whole too, saying "To say that anyone could have made this record may be overstating the case, but the fact is that there is no way of knowing that this is a Sergio Mendes record without looking at the jacket." While not reviewing the whole album, record producer and YouTube personality Rick Beato declared "Never Gonna Let You Go" "the most complicated hit song of all time".

Chart performance

References

Sérgio Mendes albums
1983 albums
Albums produced by Sérgio Mendes
Albums produced by Dave Grusin
A&M Records albums